Florican may refer to birds of the bustard family:

Bengal florican (Houbaropsis bengalensis)
Lesser florican (Sypheotides indica)